Turgon may refer to:
Turgon, Charente, a commune in Nouvelle-Aquitaine, France
Bruce Turgon, American musician
Turgon of Gondolin, a character in J. R. R. Tolkien's Middle-earth legendarium